Sayerr Jobe was a 19th-century lamane and founder of Serekunda, the largest city in The Gambia. Sayerr, originally from the Sine-Saloum region of Senegal, migrated to the Gambia in the mid 19th Century and is believed to have initially settled around Jinack Island in Banjul, before relocating to the southern bank of the country where he established Serrekunda. He died in 1896 and is buried at the Serrekunda Cemetery. He is part of the wider Jobe (or Diop) family of Koki, Cayor in Senegal. A  relative of Lat Dior Jobe (King of Cayor and Baol), and of Massamba Koki Jobe—the Lord of Koki.

References

19th-century Gambian people
Year of birth missing
Year of death missing
Lamane